Hepner Hall, designed by the senior architectural designer of the California Division of the State Architect, Howard Spencer Hazen, and completed in 1931, is the iconic academic building in the center of San Diego State University (SDSU)'s campus, just north of Malcolm A. Love Library at the entrance to the Campanile Walkway and main quad.

Hepner Hall is home to SDSU's School of Social Work, along with the Department of Gerontology and the University Center on Aging. Several faculty offices and research centers also are housed in Hepner Hall, along with an assortment of classrooms and lecture halls.

Symbol of the SDSU campus 
Hepner Hall is the symbol of the campus, with its Mission Revival Style architecture, open-faced bell tower and archway. It is the most photographed building on campus. The tower bells are rung only once a year, during the yearly commencement ceremonies.

SDSU logo and seal 
Hepner Hall is the centerpiece of SDSU's revised logo and presidential seal, which were unveiled in 2004.

Architecture 
Entrance to the building is gained through the building's impressive portales, which are framed by turquoise and white tile. Two massive turrets frame the Catalan-style archway, which is topped by a Mission-style bell tower (campanario). Inside the archway is a ribbed Moorish-style arch vaulted ceiling with a simulated Moorish wrought iron lantern hanging from its center.

History 
One of the original buildings on the SDSU campus, originally Hepner Hall was the Arts and Letters Building. It was renamed in 1976 in honor of Walter R. Hepner, President of the university from 1935 to 1952.  The building is listed on the National Register of Historic Places.

See also 
 Aztec Center
 Hardy Memorial Tower
 Malcolm A. Love Library
 San Diego State University

References

External links 

 Map of SDSU campus with location of Hepner Hall

San Diego State University
Buildings and structures in San Diego
Mission Revival architecture in California
Historic district contributing properties in California
National Register of Historic Places in San Diego
University and college buildings on the National Register of Historic Places in California